Bathurst Courthouse is a heritage-listed courthouse at Russell Street, Bathurst, Bathurst Region, New South Wales, Australia. Constructed in the Federation Free Classical style based on original designs by Colonial Architect, James Barnet, the building structure was completed in 1880 under the supervision of Barnet's successor, Government Architect, Walter Liberty Vernon. The property is owned by Attorney General's Department (State Government). It was added to the New South Wales State Heritage Register on 2 April 1999.

History 

The current Bathurst Court House replaced three earlier Court House buildings, the last was demolished before 1880 to make way for the forecourt to the new Court House. Designed by the Colonial Architect James Barnet, the dominant central Court Block was built as part of an overall design which incorporated the former Post and Telegraph Office wings. In 1893 tenders were called by Government Architect Walter Liberty Vernon for the construction of the clock tower completed in 1900.

Description 

The Bathurst Court House is constructed of local brick with sandstone detailing. The roofs are clad in copper sheeting. It is a grand and impressive building which comprises a central building flanked on either side by wing buildings. The central building is surmounted by an octagonal domed tower with turrets and has a two-storey pediment portico entrance. All of the rooms have external outlets into brick walled courtyards and a clerestory semi circular apse galleries on two sides.

The architectural style is Victorian free classical. The exterior consists of brick, stone and copper.

Heritage listing 
The Bathurst Courthouse is one of the finest Victorian Court House buildings in New South Wales. Built as part of a precinct of Victorian public buildings, it is a landmark building prominently sited in the town centre of Bathurst. The building has a lengthy association with the provision of justice in the district.

Bathurst Courthouse was listed on the New South Wales State Heritage Register on 2 April 1999.

See also 

 Courthouses in New South Wales

References

Bibliography

Attribution

Further reading

External links

 at 

Courthouses in New South Wales
Government buildings completed in 1880
1880 establishments in Australia
James Barnet buildings
Walter Liberty Vernon buildings
Bathurst, New South Wales
New South Wales State Heritage Register
Articles incorporating text from the New South Wales State Heritage Register